The Sulawesi free-tailed bat (Mops sarasinorum) is a species of bat in the family Molossidae. It is found in Indonesia and the Philippines.

Taxonomy and etymology
It was described as a new species in 1899 by German biologist Christian Erich Hermann von Meyer. Von Meyer placed it in the now-defunct genus Nyctinomus with a binomial of N. sarasinorum. The eponym for the species name "sarasinorum" was Paul and Fritz Sarasin, a pair of Swiss cousins who conducted a research expedition in Sulawesi.

Description
Its fur color is variable, with individuals documented with blackish brown, blackish chestnut, or chesnut-brown.

Range and habitat
It is native to Southeast Asia where it is found in Indonesia and the Philippines.

Conservation
As of 2016, it is evaluated as a data deficient species by the IUCN.

References

Mops (bat)
Bats of Southeast Asia
Bats of Indonesia
Mammals of Sulawesi
Bat, Sulawesi
Taxonomy articles created by Polbot
Mammals described in 1899
Taxa named by Christian Erich Hermann von Meyer